Tekumatla is a village in Mancherial district of the Indian state of Telangana.
It is located in Jaipur mandal.

Tekumatla has approximately 3000 people and has a primary school.

References

Villages in Adilabad district